In mathematics, the Mahler measure  of a polynomial  with complex coefficients is defined as

where  factorizes over the complex numbers  as

The Mahler measure can be viewed as a kind of height function.

In particular, if  is a Pisot number or a Salem number, then its Mahler measure is simply .

The Mahler measure is named after the German-born Australian mathematician Kurt Mahler.

Properties 

 The Mahler measure is multiplicative: 
 The Mahler measure of a monic integer polynomial is a Perron number.

Higher-dimensional Mahler measure 

The Mahler measure  of a multi-variable polynomial  is defined similarly by the formula

It inherits the above three properties of the Mahler measure for a one-variable polynomial.

The multi-variable Mahler measure has been shown, in some cases, to be related to special values
of zeta-functions and -functions. For example, in 1981, Smyth proved the formulas

where  is the Dirichlet L-function, and

where  is the Riemann zeta function. Here  is called the logarithmic Mahler measure.

Some results by Lawton and Boyd

From the definition, the Mahler measure is viewed as the integrated values of polynomials over the torus (also see Lehmer's conjecture). If  vanishes on the torus , then the convergence of the integral defining  is not obvious, but it is known that  does converge and is equal to a limit of one-variable Mahler measures, which had been conjectured by Boyd.

This is formulated as follows: Let  denote the integers and define  . If  is a polynomial in  variables and  define the polynomial  of one variable by

and define  by

where .

Boyd's proposal

Boyd provided more general statements than the above theorem. He pointed out  that the classical Kronecker's theorem, which characterizes monic polynomials with integer coefficients all of whose roots are inside the unit disk, can be regarded as characterizing those polynomials of one variable whose measure is exactly 1, and that this result extends to polynomials in several variables.

Define an extended cyclotomic polynomial to be a polynomial of the form

Let  be the set of polynomials that are products of monomials  and extended cyclotomic polynomials.

This led Boyd to consider the set of values

and the union . An immediate consequence of this conjecture would be the truth of Lehmer's conjecture, albeit without an explicit lower bound. As Smyth's result suggests that  , Boyd further conjectures that

Mahler measure and entropy 
The topological entropy (which is equal to the measure-theoretic entropy) of this action, is given by a Mahler measure (or is infinite). In the general case, the entropy of the action is expressed as a sum of logarithmic Mahler measures over the generators of the principal associated prime ideals of the module. Lind also showed that the infinite-dimensional torus  either has ergodic automorphisms of finite positive entropy or only has automorphisms of infinite entropy depending on the solution to Lehmer's problem.

See also 

Bombieri norm
Height of a polynomial

Notes

References 

 

Everest, Graham and Ward, Thomas (1999). "Heights of polynomials and entropy in algebraic dynamics". Springer-Verlag London, Ltd., London. xii+211 pp. ISBN: 1-85233-125-9

 .

External links 

Mahler Measure on MathWorld
Jensen's Formula on MathWorld

Analytic number theory
Polynomials